Li Zhisui (1919 – 13 February 1995) was Mao Zedong's personal doctor and confidant. He was born in Beijing, China in 1919. After emigrating to the United States, he wrote a biography of Mao entitled The Private Life of Chairman Mao.  The biography was based on his recollection of journals he had kept, and later found expedient to destroy, while a doctor to Mao.

In the summer of 1968 and during the Cultural Revolution, Mao's wife, Jiang Qing, placed Li's life in danger by, accusing him of trying to poison her. Li managed to hide, living incognito with the workers of the Beijing Textile Factory. These workers were among the 30,000 Mao dispatched to Qinghua University to quell the warfare there between two factions of the Red Guards.

On 13 February 1995, Li died following a heart attack at his son's house in Carol Stream, Illinois, where he had been living since emigrating.

Li was interested in psychiatry. In October 1986, Li wrote the Preface for the first Chinese textbook on psychopharmacology, "Psychopharmacological Treatment for Psychiatric Disorders." [Editors: Tsai (Cai) Neng (蔡能), Shi Hong-zhang (史鸿璋), etc., Shanghai Scientific Technology Publisher, May 1987]

Work
The private life of Chairman Mao: the memoirs of Mao's private physician, Publ. Random House, New York (1994),

References 

  Li Zhisui on Encyclopædia Britannica, 2009 

1919 births
1995 deaths
Physicians from Beijing
Writers from Beijing
Chinese biographers